SpeechFX, Inc., (formerly Fonix Corporation) offers voice technology for mobile phone and wireless devices, interactive video games, toys, home appliances, computer telephony systems and vehicle telematics. SpeechFX speech solutions are based on the firm’s proprietary neural network-based automatic speech recognition (ASR) and Fonix DECtalk, a text-to-speech speech synthesis system (TTS). Fonix speech technology is user-independent, meaning no voice training is involved.

Product applications
SpeechFX works with application developers and equipment manufacturers to speech enable devices and systems, resulting in voice-based user interfaces that increase convenience and simplify functionality. SpeechFX technology supports multiple operating systems and hardware platforms and excels on embedded systems, where memory and operating power are at a premium. SpeechFX technology is optimized for noisy environments and is available in more than a dozen highly intelligible TTS languages and more than 10 speaker-independent ASR languages.

Product implementation
SpeechFX speech recognition technologies are currently available for many major products and systems, including Microsoft Xbox and Xbox 360, Sony PlayStation 2, PlayStation 3, PC, Seiko Epson semiconductor chips, Pocket PC and smartphone devices, and others. Casio and other Asian manufacturers currently offer several handheld electronic dictionaries featuring SpeechFX text-to-speech. Many mid-sized businesses use SpeechFX’s telephony product as a 24-hour speech recognition telephone attendant.

Company information
Founded in 1994, SpeechFX, Inc. is headquartered in Lindon, Utah. Before 2011, the company was named Fonix Corporation.

References

Software companies based in Utah
American companies established in 1994
Companies based in Utah
1994 establishments in Utah
Software companies of the United States